The flag of Buenos Aires Province, Argentina, was created by students and officially adopted by Provincial Law 11.997 on August 12, 1997, after being chosen among other designs by vote of the educative community in which 270,000 students aged 12–18 took part in over 2 years, supported by specialists and parents. There were 81,525 proposals, 32 of which were selected from all 16 regions along 1995–96. 4 of the final 32 were selected by a jury to be voted on by 2 million students on 12 August 1997. The flag was designed by the boys of Schools Matheu Gelicich and Faustino Sarmiento (both located in Capitán Sarmiento), chosen by 1,500,000 voters, garnering over half the vote.

Symbolism

The colour green represents the province's fields; the blue refers to its rivers, the sea at its coasts and the sky over it. The red hemisphere symbolizes federalism. The yellow stands for production's fecundity. The laurel leaves represent the province's glory. The cog wheel stands for industrial production, while the half sunflower stands for agricultural output.

Previous flag

This was the official flag of Buenos Aires Province towards the end of federalist governor Juan Manuel de Rosas' term. The flag was created on the basic pattern of the flag of Argentina, but the blue color was made darker as the light blue in Argentina's national flag was considered at the time to be a symbol of the Unitarian Party. In the Rosas' design, the red hats, the dark blue background, and the red sun all symbolize federalism. The sun's original yellow color was also darkened over time until it became also red.

After Buenos Aires Province's secession from the Argentine Confederation in 1852, the same design was also used as a national flag by the Confederation until 1861.

See also
 Flag of Buenos Aires
Coat of arms of Buenos Aires Province

References

Buenos Aires Province
Buenos Aires Province
Government of Buenos Aires Province
Politics of Buenos Aires Province
Buenos Aires Province